Blevins School District  is a school district based in Blevins, Arkansas.

The district encompasses  of land primarily in Hempstead County and portions of Nevada County.

The Washington School District was dissolved on July 1, 1990. A portion of its territory was given to the Blevins district. On July 1, 2004, the Emmet School District consolidated into the Blevins School District.

Schools 
 Blevins Elementary School, serving prekindergarten through grade 6.
 Blevins High School, serving grades 7 through 12.

Further reading
 (Download)
 (Download)

References

External links
 
 

Education in Hempstead County, Arkansas
Education in Nevada County, Arkansas
School districts in Arkansas